Broken is the first extended play (EP) and second major release by American industrial rock band Nine Inch Nails. It was released on September 22, 1992, by Nothing, TVT, and Interscope Records. The EP was produced by frontman Trent Reznor and Flood.

The release consists entirely of new material and replaces the synth-pop style of the band's 1989 debut album Pretty Hate Machine with a considerably heavier sound that would act as a precursor to their second album The Downward Spiral (1994). Its lyrical themes are in line with those of their succeeding work. The record was promoted with music videos for five of the eight songs which were censored due to their violent content, as well as a short film of the same name, which was never officially released, but was later leaked as a bootleg.

Although it was derided by some critics for its lyrical content, Broken also received positive reviews from critics and reached number seven on the US Billboard 200, eventually receiving a platinum certification from the Recording Industry Association of America (RIAA). The recording helped to propel Nine Inch Nails into mainstream popularity, and later received two Grammy Awards (both for Best Metal Performance) for the songs "Wish" and "Happiness in Slavery".

Background
After the commercial and critical success of Pretty Hate Machine (1989), TVT Records, the first record label to sign the band, pressured Trent Reznor to record a very similar album in the hope that it would have similarly successful singles. Steve Gottlieb, the CEO of TVT Records, was insistent that he would not release anything other than an album very similar to Pretty Hate Machine. Reznor demanded his label terminate his contract, due to their restriction of his creative control of the Nine Inch Nails project. They ignored his plea.

Reznor then objected to the label's attempted interference with his intellectual property. This much-publicized feud with TVT led Reznor to use a variety of monikers for the production of his next studio release. Reznor later said that he hated TVT, in part due to their classification of Nine Inch Nails as a synth-pop band. He reached a deal with the record label Interscope Records:

We made it very clear we were not doing another record for TVT. But they made it pretty clear they weren't ready to sell. So I felt like, well, I've finally got this thing going but it's dead. Flood and I had to record Broken under a different band name, because if TVT found out we were recording, they could confiscate all our shit and release it. Jimmy Iovine got involved with Interscope, and we kind of got slave-traded. It wasn't my doing. I didn't know anything about Interscope. And I was real pissed off at him at first because it was going from one bad situation to potentially another one. But Interscope went into it like they really wanted to know what I wanted. It was good, after I put my raving lunatic act on.

Recording
Reznor secretly made the then-untitled recording under various pseudonyms to avoid record company interference. English record producer Flood, who produced "Head Like a Hole" and "Terrible Lie", the first two tracks on Pretty Hate Machine (1989), returned to work in 1992 on the EP for "Wish", "Last" and "Gave Up".

As Reznor explains in retrospect: "Broken [...] had a lot of the super-thick chunk sound, and almost every guitar sound on that record was [tapes consisting of] me playing through an old Zoom pedal and then going direct into Digidesign's TurboSynth [software in a Macintosh computer]. Then I used a couple of key ingredients to make it [be heard as being] unlike any 'real' sound."

The instrumental break of "Physical" (at 3:49) features a half-speed recording of Reznor's dog, Maise, barking, and Sean Beavan's line, "Ow!...fucker!", after Maise bit him. Maise was credited with "barks and roars" in the liner notes as a result. After being owned by Reznor for over three years, Maise died after falling from a three-story balcony during the Self Destruct Tour.

The record underwent development at six different studios, Hell (New Orleans, Louisiana), Royal Recorders at Lake Geneva, Wisconsin, South Beach Studios at  Miami, Florida; Village Recorder and A&M Studios at Los Angeles, California, and Le Pig at Beverly Hills, California. The last two studios were later used during the production process for The Downward Spiral (1994). Tom Baker mastered the EP at Futuredisc. Following this step, Reznor presented the recording to Interscope Records in September 1992, and signed to the record label, making Broken Nine Inch Nails' major label debut.

Music and lyrics
Heavier than Pretty Hate Machine, Broken takes influences from industrial metal bands such as Ministry and Godflesh. There are louder mixes and more distortion on every instrument, including John Lennon's Mellotron MKII heard most particularly on "Gave Up". Reznor said he wanted the album to be "an ultra-fast chunk of death" for the listener, something that would "make your ears a little scratchy". In the liner notes, Reznor credited the 1991 Nine Inch Nails touring band as an influence on the EP's sound.

The lyrics are a critique on society, the majority of its themes involve angst, control and dependency struggles. The second promotional single from the EP, "Wish", includes the expletive fuck thrice, used on the lines "Now there's nothing more fucked up I could do", "I'm the one without this soul/I'm the one with this big fucking hole" and "Gotta listen to your big time hard line bad luck fist fuck."

Clocking at roughly one minute, "Pinion" is one of the shortest Nine Inch Nails songs. It features a series of short, ascending, distorted guitar power chords and a collage of atmospheric loops, including a reversed sample of David Bowie's "It's No Game" (which is not credited in the artwork for Broken). A portion of this is used as one of the guitar riffs in "Wish", one of the two promotional singles released from the album. "Help Me I Am in Hell", another instrumental, ends with another uncredited sample, this time from The Empire Strikes Back (1980).

There are two bonus songs, which follow 91 silent, one-second tracks (numbered 7 through 97) on most CD copies, but were included as a separate 3" CD or 7" record with early pressings. "Physical" is a cover of the Adam and the Ants song "Physical (You're So)", originally released on the Kings of the Wild Frontier LP."  In 1995, Nine Inch Nails performed "Physical" live with Adam Ant for two nights in a row. After Reznor introduced Ant and Marco Pirroni on the second night, Ant proclaimed to the audience, "It's nice to be on stage with the best fucking band in the world." "Suck" was written by Pigface, whose ever-changing lineup once included Reznor.  The slower, sparser, radically different original version appeared a year earlier on Pigface's Gub album.

Packaging
Broken was originally packaged in a trifold-out digipak, containing the six tracks on a regular compact disc and an additional three-inch mini CD with the two remaining songs, covers of Adam and the Ants' "Physical" and Pigface's "Suck". Due to the high cost of producing a two-disc EP, only 250,000 copies were released with the mini CD, subsequently Broken was re-released as one CD in October 1992, having the bonus songs heard on tracks 98 and 99 respectively, without any visual notice except for the credits, and tracks 7-97 each containing one second of silence. The cassette release featured tracks 1–6 on side one, with "Physical" and "Suck" appearing at the tail end of side two, after approximately 15 minutes of silence. The United Kingdom vinyl release was pressed onto a one sided 12" which featured the six main tracks. The two bonus cuts were issued on a 7-inch single given away inside the EP in a white die-cut sleeve (an unusual method for packaging an album on the vinyl format).

All copies include the logo of Nothing Records, a first for the works of Reznor, making the EP itself Nothing's first release. The vanity record label was founded by Reznor along with John Malm Jr., who was his manager at the time, when he had involvement in a feud with TVT Records. It had a short lifespan (Nothing Records existed for nearly 15 years); the label was created in 1992, as Reznor signed to Interscope before TVT entered into a joint venture with that major record label, where he mailed parts culled from his publishing rights to TVT Music, in exchange for the freedom of having his own imprint.

The influence of Reznor's conflict with his former label, TVT, is evident in multiple aspects of the EP. After a long list of credits, the packaging reads, "no thanks: you know who you fucking are" followed by "the slave thinks he is released from bondage only to find a stronger set of chains." These comments are likely directed towards TVT Records' Steve Gottlieb, who refused to let Reznor out of his contract, sparking legal battles between the two parties. The "no thanks" part may be a response to the liner notes of Ministry's Psalm 69: The Way to Succeed and the Way to Suck Eggs album, which featured a cryptic "no thanks, you know who you are."
Aurally, at the beginning of "Physical", Reznor whispers, "eat your heart out, Steve." Visually, in a music video for "Gave Up", the monitor of a Mac computer running Pro Tools  reads "fuck you steve".

Despite the addition of "no thanks: you know who you fucking are", there is a "Thank You" section. People listed in that portion include Jimmy Iovine, Ros Earles, Island Records, Eric Greenspan, Rick Rubin, Joe Mcewen, Seymour Stein, Susie Tallman, Mark O'Shea, Ian Copeland, Kevin Westenberg and Sheroa Rees-Davies.

The writing credit for "Suck" caused a minor controversy.  Whereas Pigface albums list all contributors to each of the songs, in this case "Atkins/Rieflin/Barker/Reznor" as listed on Gub, the credit on Broken states "written by t. reznor/pigface". On the later Pigface release Truth Will Out, the writing credit for the song is "whatever trent says – really – no shit".  Reznor talked about his problem with Pigface in an unreleased 1992 Melody Maker Magazine interview. Reznor says he came in at the end of the Gub recording session, when time was running out, sang the lyrics for Suck over the leftover drum snippets they had, threw it together and said it was done. He stated he doesn't like the recording.  Later when Pigface were going to go on tour, Reznor taught them the proper music he had written for the song which is completely different than the music that he sang over on the Pigface studio recording.  Pigface toured with the song with NIN, even playing the song with Reznor a few times.  (Note: the Original Pigface recording is abstract noise and occasional bass over drum beats; nothing like Reznor's version.)  The following year, Reznor put out his version on Broken. In the liner notes, he mentions that there were personality conflicts and people saying they deserve more than they have.

Release and reception

"It's heavy", wrote Danny Scott in Select, "it's loud and it'll rip your stinkin' head from your shoulders if you so much as breathe without permission." "Beats are hammered home with the gleeful force of a dentist's drill", said Peter Kane in Q, "while layers of rabid guitars and Reznor's spiteful voice pile on the nihilistic agony." "Reznor has shaken off the shackles of influence", observed NME, "and found his own suitably idiosyncratic niche." "Like a harrowing rape account", marveled Making Music, "it's an intensely vicious and shocking 30 minutes."

Writing for The Baltimore Sun, J. D. Considine stated: "Harder than Ministry, hookier than Nitzer Ebb, this EP is everything industrial music should be." CMJ described Broken as "an astonishingly cold, brutal and bleak EP."

The EP was certified platinum by the Recording Industry Association of America (RIAA) on December 18, 1992, despite a complete absence of touring in support of it. The first promotional single, "Happiness in Slavery", received moderate airplay, but its video's depiction of Bob Flanagan being pleasured, tortured, and killed on a device led to MTV banning it outright.  This stunted the single's growth, but the track "Wish" was much more successful with an aggressive live performance on the music video, then later winning a Grammy for Best Metal Performance. Reznor later quipped that he wanted his gravestone to read "Reznor: Died. Said 'Fist Fuck', Won a Grammy."

Music videos

Not long after the EP's release, a short horror musical film also named Broken was created during and after the production of the EP. It was rumored to be a snuff film with all of its songs with the exception of "Last", "Physical", and "Suck" playing to a scene. This film was directed by Peter Christopherson of Throbbing Gristle and Coil fame. A music video for "Gave Up" would prove to be part of the film, as well as the videos for "Happiness in Slavery" and "Wish".  Portions of Broken would, however, be released as part of the Closure VHS, which was released after The Downward Spiral. Due to the graphic substance of "Gave Up", an alternative version of the music video consisting of the song being performed at Le Pig studios by Reznor, a young Marilyn Manson, Richard Patrick and Chris Vrenna was released to MTV. Much of the cast, aside from Bob Flanagan in "Happiness in Slavery", and the band itself in "Wish", is unknown.  The film is generally credited to be directed by Christopherson, although the music videos themselves were directed by various other people: "Pinion" and "Help Me I Am in Hell" is credited to Eric Goode and Serge Becker, while "Happiness in Slavery" is credited to Jon Reiss.

A music video for "Happiness in Slavery" was universally banned, though a few attempts to air it were successful. An episode of Raw Time aired "Happiness in Slavery" at 3:00 AM to unanimously positive response from viewers. Another program, Music Link, broadcast the video at midnight.

Broken has not been given an official commercial release (according to Reznor, because they wanted to avoid the film overshadowing the prominence of the music), thus adding to its mythological status in alternative culture. The original hand-dubbed tapes were distributed by Reznor to various friends with dropouts at certain points so he could know who distributed any copies that might surface. Reznor, commenting in the "Access" section of the NIN website, implied that Gibby Haynes was responsible for the most prominent leak. This copy was traded on VHS tapes for years (resulting in many poor-quality, high-generation copies), and was later encoded in MPEG and AVI formats and distributed extensively through peer-to-peer networks and Nine Inch Nails fan websites. These are generally not of the highest quality, as they are not first-generation copies.

On December 30, 2006, an unofficial version of the film was released on a DVD disc image and distributed via BitTorrent at The Pirate Bay by the same anonymous user called "seed0" who uploaded the leaked DVD version of Closure. The DVD image represents a significant upgrade in visual and audio quality from "Broken 2.0.", and includes the oft-missing video for "Help Me I Am in Hell". Fans have speculated that this version of the film has been sourced directly from the master tapes, and that Reznor himself may have been the source of this leak along with the Closure DVD leak, as implied by a post on his official blog: "12/21/06 : Happy Holidays!  This one is a guilt-free download. (shhhh - I didn't say that out loud). If you know what I'm talking about, cool."

Track listing
All tracks are written by Trent Reznor, except where noted.

Notes
A few variations of Broken exist, mostly due to different track listing arrangements:
 The very first US CD pressings of the album had "Physical" and "Suck" included on a second disc, a three-inch mini CD. Many pressings outside the US had no second disc and these songs were tracks 7 and 8 on the main disc. Later American pressings eliminated the second disc as well and included the songs on the main disc as tracks 98 and 99. On this version tracks 7–97 consist of 4 seconds of silence each resulting in a slightly longer total playtime (33:09 vs. 31:35).
 On most pressings, US and otherwise, tracks 7/98 and 8/99 are not listed in the track listing on the back of the case. Some pressings also omit track 6, "Gave Up" from the rear listing as well.
 The only US 12-inch vinyl pressings released prior to the 2017 Definitive Edition ("promotional" only) omit the two instrumental tracks, "Pinion" and "Help Me I Am in Hell".
 Unlike the relatively large number of various CD versions, almost all cassette pressings across all regions include tracks 1–6 on side A and tracks 7–8 on side B.
 All vinyl pressings include "Physical" and "Suck" on a separate seven-inch disc.

Personnel
 Trent Reznor – writing, performance, production
 Flood – production
 Martin Atkins – drums (2, 8)
 Chris Vrenna – drums (6)
 Tom Baker – mastering

Charts

Certifications

Notes

References

Bibliography

External links
 Album Review at The Daily Collegian (Penn State)
 Album Review at Entertainmentopia
 Multi-Track zip of Last from the Broken EP, the separated channels of the song used for remixing
 Multi-Track zip of Wish from the Broken EP

1992 debut EPs
Albums produced by Flood (producer)
Albums produced by Trent Reznor
Albums recorded in a home studio
Alternative metal EPs
Industrial metal EPs
Interscope Records EPs
Nine Inch Nails EPs
Nothing Records EPs
TVT Records EPs